Woodhorn Railway is a  long railway on  narrow-gauge track.  The line runs from Woodhorn, Northumberland, England, to a restaurant in the car park of the QE2 lake.

History of the railway 

In 1991, the Woodhorn Museum and Northumberland Archives (Wansbeck Council) was given an ex-mining locomotive and three man-riding cars by the NCB, following the closure of Vane Tempest colliery in County Durham. It was decided rather than allow these vehicles to become a static exhibition, it would better serve the heritage of the community if they were made operational and allowed to develop their potential as a visitor attraction. Because of this, a volunteer group was formed to manage and build a railway on which the vehicles could operate.

The line was built, being completed in 1994 and ran from the site of the present Museum, along the side of the QE2 lake, terminating at the platform known as Lakeside Halt. The railway was not operational in June 2021.  A notice at the Lakeside terminus says that operations are suspended due to the track and running stock needing repairs.  The track looks very solid but is overgrown by weeds and very rusty.

Locomotives

Black Diamond (Hunslet)
One of two current locomotives, the Hunslet is the line's longest serving machine. Delivered to Woodhorn in 1991, primarily as a static exhibit following the closure of Vane Tempest Colliery but is now the lead locomotive of the fleet. It has been renamed as the Black Diamond, out of respect for the industry in which he formerly worked because the name "Hunslet" is picked out on the radiator grill. It is painted in original livery of green and black. The locomotive was built by the Hunslet Engine Company in Leeds in 1975, weighing 9.5 tons, powered by a four-cylinder water-cooled diesel engine.

Edward Stanton (Schöma)
This locomotive came to the railway in 2008 and whilst it was built by Schöma in Germany, the railway acquired it after the construction of the Channel Tunnel between England and France, meaning this locomotive is the youngest in the railway's fleet. Edward is a three-cylinder air-cooled diesel engine, weighing at around 4.5 tons. Originally in a white livery, but has since been repainted, and both doors and windows have been added for better safety and operation.

Rio-Gen
Rio-Gen was built in the UK by Hunslet, and was purchased in 2013 from Singapore.

External links 
Railway's official website
Facebook page

2 ft gauge railways in England